Loch Macaterick is a loch in East Ayrshire, Scotland within Galloway Forest Park and Merrick Kells SSSI.
The loch is situated to the north of Macaterick (499 m), to the west of Craigfionn (366 m) and to the southeast of Loch Riecawr.

A boardwalk through a forested area used to lead to the loch from a nearby track but it was removed during forestry works.
The loch area has suffered limited heather beetle impacts.

References

Macaterick